"Bad Sneakers" is a song by jazz rock band Steely Dan. It was released as the second single and track on their 1975 album Katy Lied. Producer Gary Katz later regretted not releasing the song as the first single.

Cash Box noted that "a razored guitar bridge highlights and counterbalances some laidback vocals with the overall sound layered and dimensional." Record World said that it "pieces together bits of the L.A. r&r experience while stranded outside of Radio City Music Hall."

Michael McDonald's vocals on the song are some of his first for the band; he would continue to perform background vocals for the band in recordings until 1980. The song also appears on the compilation albums A Decade of Steely Dan and Citizen Steely Dan.

Personnel 
 Donald Fagen – lead vocals
 Michael Omartian – piano
 Walter Becker – lead guitar
 Hugh McCracken – rhythm guitar
 Chuck Rainey – bass guitar
 Jeff Porcaro – drums
 Victor Feldman – percussion, vibraphone 
 Michael McDonald – backing vocals

Covers 
The alternative band The Push Stars covered the song for the Me, Myself & Irene (2000) soundtrack.

References

External links 
 Steely Dan at Discogs
 Bad Sneakers Lyrics

1975 songs
Steely Dan songs
Songs written by Donald Fagen
Songs written by Walter Becker
ABC Records singles
Song recordings produced by Gary Katz